Park Wan-kyu (born December 1, 1973) is a South Korean singer. He was a lead vocalist of the band Boohwal, and left them to release his first solo album, with the title track "Love of a Thousands Years (천 년의 사랑)" that became his signature song in 1999 but returned to the group in 2019 after 22 years.

He has recorded many soundtracks for Korean dramas, and had his first substantial acting role in one in 2013.

Music career

Boohwal

In 1997, as Boohwal's vocalist he recorded their 5th album, Discovery of Fire with them, singing their title song "Lonely Night," and reunited with them in 2011 for their collaboration project with the song "Secret." When discussing Boohwal's several vocalists, the band's leader Kim Tae-won said he sang with an authentic soulfulness which made his vocals both sad and beautiful. In 2019 he rejoined Boohwal.

Television

He appeared as a contestant on I Am a Singer and in the concert special "Survival – I am a Singer" at the Expo 2012 in Yeosu.

Drama soundtracks and acting

He has performed a number of OSTs for K-dramas, including "Always" for Goddess of Marriage in 2013, in which he also acted, playing the part of a legendary rocker on hiatus in the citrus plantations of Jejudo, living as his own boss as a free spirit, with his wife. Others include 2014's "Wind Breeze" for Empress Ki, and a rock ballad "Stop Time" in April 2016 for The Royal Gambler.

Personal life

In September 2011, in an appearance on tvN's show Love Song he talked about his divorce, and expressed an apology to his ex-wife and children.

Discography

Studio album

 Thousand Years of Love (1999)
 It's Now Or Never (2002)
 Exodus (2006)
 1999–2006 (2006)

Soundtracks

Filmography

Television series

Awards and nominations

References

1973 births
Living people
South Korean male television actors
South Korean rock singers
21st-century South Korean male singers